The Picatinny Arsenal ( or ) is an American military research and manufacturing facility located on  of land in Jefferson and Rockaway Township in Morris County, New Jersey,  United States, encompassing Picatinny Lake and Lake Denmark. The Arsenal is the headquarters of the US Army Combat Capabilities Development Command Armaments Center. It is known for developing the ubiquitous Picatinny rail, as well as being the Army's center of expertise for small arms cartridge ammunition.

(As written on Picatinny Arsenal's website)

"Picatinny Arsenal Historical Overview

On 6 September 1880, the War Department established the Dover Powder Depot. Four days later, it changed the name to Picatinny Powder Depot. In 1907, the Army altered the name to Picatinny Arsenal and established its first powder factory on the site."

The facility was founded in 1880 as the Picatinny Powder Depot. Soon afterward, the Navy acquired a portion of the arsenal to establish the Lake Denmark Powder Depot, later known as Lake Denmark Naval Ammunition Depot. It manufactured gunpowder until after World War I, at which time the facility also began producing heavy munitions and grew more involved in research and development activities. During World War II Picatinny was a major large-caliber-round loading plant with 18,000 employees. Today, the facility develops new technologies for the US Armed Forces and builds various munitions, weapons and armor systems.

Picatinny Arsenal is also home to the US Army Explosive Ordnance Disposal Technology Directorate.  This group is responsible for the creation of tools, equipment, and procedures for US Army EOD personnel.  Some of their more recent inventions were the use of weapons on a robot platform and the SWORDS robot.  Their building has been recently renamed in honor of one of their deceased soldiers, SFC Scott "Smitty" Smith, who was killed in Iraq in July 2006.

History

Prior to the American Civil War gunpowder was stored by the United States Army at various powder facilities throughout the eastern United States. Many of these facilities were located in the South and were confiscated by the Confederate States of America at the beginning of the war. The federal government began looking for a central storage depot to be located near the large cities of the northeast.

The United States War Department established the Dover Powder Depot on September 6, 1880. Four days later, it changed the name to the "Picatinny Powder Depot", "after the Lenape-named peak overlooking the old forge, loosely translated to mean “rugged cliff by water” or “water by the hills.”"

A deed dated June 26, 1880 records the first land purchase for the future Picatinny Arsenal. George E. Righter transferred  centered on Lake Picatinny to the United States government in return for $35,874.00. This area, afterwards known as the Middle Forge Tract because of the forge located there during the Revolutionary War, became the central area of the arsenal. In 1880 and 1881, the government also purchased tracts from Uel H. Wiggins, Edward C. Fiedler and other, Henry and Michael Doland, and John E. Kindred. These initial purchases, including the Middle Forge Tract, covered  and cost a total of $62,750.00. At the same time, the government gave $200.00 to Lewis Spicer and his wife for a  strip on which to construct a road from Spicertown to the powder depot. In 1891, the army transferred  bordering Lake Denmark to the navy. The arsenal was located in a valley between two sets of hills that might shield the surrounding countryside from any accidental explosions.

In 1907, the Army altered the name to the "Picatinny Arsenal" and established its first powder factory on the site. While continuing to produce munitions, the arsenal moved into research and development work with the start of a school to instruct officers in weaponry sciences in 1911, the establishment of testing and control laboratories during the World War I era, and the beginning of a small, experimental plant for the design and development of artillery ammunition in 1919. In 1921, the arsenal took over responsibility for experimental work on fuzes.

On July 10, 1926, lightning struck a Navy ammunition warehouse and started a fire. As a result, several million pounds of explosives detonated over a period of two or three days. This left not only structural devastation, but military and civilian casualties as well. The value of ammunition destroyed was the equivalent of a billion dollars in present-day terms.  As a result of a full-scale Congressional investigation, Congress directed the establishment of the Armed Forces Explosives Safety Board to provide oversight on every aspect of explosives under the control of the US Armed Forces.  The review led to creation of a remote, safe depot to serve the West Coast, which became the Hawthorne Naval Ammunition Depot, in Nevada, opened in 1928.

The arsenal continued to realize its potential as a research and development facility in the years between the two world wars. Major accomplishments of this period included better methods for storing smokeless powder, improved processing of cyclonite (more commonly called RDX), and the discovery of a new explosive, then known as haleite but later known as Ednatol. (The discoverer was George C. Hale, the arsenal's chief chemist.)

Over the years, the Army continued to make small land purchases to round out arsenal boundaries, but the next major expansion came in 1941, just before the United States entered World War II. At this time, the Army purchased the land between the Cannon Gates and the present main entrance near Route 15. This included Spicertown, an unincorporated village in Rockaway Township. Spicertown had declined from a relatively thriving 19th-century community of small but profitable farms to a rather depressed area in 1941. Many of the residences housed military families until the early 2000s (decade); the last were demolished in 2007. Near Parker Road is property acquired from the estate of John E. Larson for $16,000.00. The purchase price included  of land. Another former Spicertown property consisting of  cost the government $19,769.00. At the time, the government appraiser praised the landscaping and the grassy knoll location.

World War II interfered with the arsenal's efforts to concentrate on research and development. As one of the few facilities with the ability to manufacture munitions, it employed 18,000 people and ran three shifts turning out bombs and artillery shells. However, it still had its research triumphs, especially the development of a delay fuze for skip bombing and special bombs for dams and oil fields. It also pioneered production processes later transferred to munitions manufacturers around the country.

In the 1960s, Picatinny was the site of the United States' Army Munitions Command.

After World War II, Picatinny refocused its efforts on developing new weapons and munitions. Its support to the American forces in Korea included an improved bazooka and an illuminating rifle grenade. In periods of peace, the arsenal made important contributions to progress in the areas of radar, pyrotechnics, missiles, time fuzes, and nuclear munitions (including the M65 atomic cannon 280mm howitzer known as "Atomic Annie"). When war broke out again, it gave troops in Vietnam a complete family of 40 mm ammunition for grenade launchers and helicopter gunships.

In 1977, the Army recognized Picatinny's leadership in weapons and munitions development by headquartering its Armament Research and Development Command (ARRADCOM) at the arsenal and giving it responsibility for developing small caliber weapons and munitions.

In 1983, the Army disestablished the Armament Research and Development Command and Picatinny became the home of the Armament Research and Development Center (ARDC). In 1986, the name again changed to the "Armament Research, Development and Engineering Center" (ARDEC).

In 1991, during the Persian Gulf War, Picatinny Arsenal provided support in their development of the Patriot Missile warhead that was used as a countermeasure to the Iraqi SCUD missile.

In 1992, Picatinny Arsenal  was tasked to develop a standardized mounting system after the U.S. Army was dissatisfied with the products on the market.  The Picatinny team was headed by mechanical designer Gary Houtsma (who was awarded the Order of Saint Maurice Award in 2014 for this contribution), who took the measurements from about twenty different Weaver rail products from weapons bunkers at Picatinny (and even local sporting goods stores) and came up with an average set of numbers set on a 45-degree angled surface.  Houtsma then took the specifications over to the production facility and requested they design a dimensioning style so the rail could be easily produced and inspected.  The factory recognized the similarity of the purposed rail interface to the existing rail design on 105 mm howitzers, so they chose to scale down the howitzer rail design and co-opted the production and inspection procedures. It was adopted and fielded in 1995 with the designation MIL-STD-1913, dated February 3, 1995.

In 2007, Picatinny Arsenal's largest tenant, ARDEC, received the Malcolm Baldrige National Quality Award.

In 2014, Picatinny Arsenal obtained its first all-female command pairing, with Lt. Col. Ingrid Parker and Sgt. Maj. Rosalba Dumont-Carrion.

In 2019, the United States Army Armament Research, Development and Engineering Center became a center under the new Army Future's Command and became known as the Combat Capabilities Development Command - Armaments Center (CCDC-AC).

Lake Denmark Powder Depot

In 1891, the navy acquired  of the arsenal to establish the Lake Denmark Powder Depot, later known as the "Lake Denmark Naval Ammunition Depot". On July 10, 1926, lightning struck one of the explosives storage structures during a thunderstorm and started a fire. As a result, several million pounds of explosives detonated over a period of two or three days. Captain Otto Dowling, USN was in charge at the time, and received a Distinguished Service Cross for his handling of the situation. This caused $47,000,000 in damage, massive structural devastation (187 of 200 buildings destroyed), and military and civilian casualties. As a result of a full-scale Congressional investigation, Congress directed the establishment of the Armed Forces Explosives Safety Board to provide oversight on every aspect of explosives under the control of the US Armed Forces.

In 1960, the army resumed control of land it had given the navy, bringing the installation to its current size and shape.

Transportation
The primary transportation in the early days of the arsenal was by rail. The early Wharton & Northern Railroad (succeeded by the Jersey Central) was laid from Wharton to Green Pond through the heart of the valley in which Picatinny Arsenal now resides. This line connected the various railroads serving the Wharton area with the New York, Susquehanna & Western Railroad at Green Pond. Today, rail service through the arsenal is just a memory with only a disused stub line into the arsenal and scattered traces of the once busy narrow gauge railway. Some of the remaining track has been covered with macadam and turned into pedestrian walking paths.

BRAC Decision

Base Realignment and Closure, 2005 directed the department of defense to establish Picatinny as the DOD specialty site for guns and ammunition, and to relocate Navy technical experts to Picatinny. It recommended:

Creation of an integrated weapons and armament specialty site for guns and ammunition at Picatinny Arsenal
Consolidation of the following facilities at Picatinny Arsenal:
Adelphi Laboratory Center in Maryland
Naval Surface Warfare Center Division at Crane, Indiana, including the Fallbrook, California, detachment
Naval Surface Warfare Center Division Dahlgren, Virginia
Louisville, Kentucky, detachment of Naval Surface Warfare Center Division, Port Hueneme, California
Naval Air Warfare Center Weapons Division, China Lake, California
Naval Surface Warfare Center Division, Indian Head, Maryland
Naval Surface Warfare Center Division, Earle, New Jersey

This recommendation realigned and consolidates those gun and ammunition facilities working in weapons and armaments research, development and acquisition. Picatinny Arsenal is the center for the DOD's research, development and acquisition of guns and ammunition, with a workload more than an order of magnitude greater than any other DOD facility in this area. It also is home to the DOD's single manager for conventional ammunition.

Environmental contamination
Since 1976 the Army conducted numerous environmental studies on Picatinny; in March 1990 it was declared a superfund and placed on the National Priorities List. 176 sites are to be addressed under the Installation Restoration Program.

Picatinny had established a Technical Review Committee in 1989 and met every other month. It became a Restoration Advisory Board, and public meetings are
advertised in the Star Ledger and Daily Record.

References

External links
Picatinny Arsenal home page
 History of Picatinny Arsenal
Lake Denmark Naval Ammunition Depot history
Global Security – Picatinny Arsenal
To Arm and Shield
The Armament Research, Development, and Engineering Center at Picatinny Arsenal has been awarded the 2007 Malcolm Baldridge National Quality Award.
official website of the Picatinny Arsenal Environmental Restoration Advisory Board (PAERAB)

Firearm manufacturers of the United States
Buildings and structures in Morris County, New Jersey
Research installations of the United States Army
Forts in New Jersey
Historic American Engineering Record in New Jersey
Jefferson Township, New Jersey
Rockaway Township, New Jersey
United States Army arsenals
United States Army arsenals during World War II
Superfund sites in New Jersey
1880 establishments in New Jersey
Armories in New Jersey